Jesús Muñoz may refer to:

 Jesús Muñoz Tébar (1847-1909), Venezuelan politician
 Jesús Muñoz (footballer) (born 1976), Spanish footballer